The Marapendi Natural Municipal Park (  is a municipal nature park, a public recreation facility of approximately  within the Marapendi Natural Reserve (located in the Barra da Tijuca and Recreio neighborhoods of Rio de Janeiro, Brazil and part of a protected area for the preservation of native plants and animals.

The park is part of the Carioca Mosaic, established in 2011.

References

Sources

Geography of Rio de Janeiro (city)
Parks in Rio de Janeiro (city)
Municipal nature parks of Brazil